Sara Serraiocco (born 13 August 1990) is an Italian actress, best known for playing Baldwin in the TV series Counterpart.

Life and career 
Born in Pescara, Serraiocco developed from a young age a passion for dance and cinema, later working as a dance teacher before pursuing a career in acting. In 2010, Serraiocco moved to Rome where she attended the Centro Sperimentale di Cinematografia Italian National Film School.

After appearing in one episode of crime series R.I.S. Roma,  Serraiocco made her film debut in 2013, starring in Salvo, awarded The Critics' Week Grand Prix during 2013 Cannes Film Festival. Her performance as a blind girl brought up in the suburbs of Palermo got her several awards including the Italian Golden Globe for best actress and the "Guglielmo Biraghi" Nastro d'Argento as best new talent.

In 2014, Serraiocco was picked by director Liliana Cavani to play the role of Saint Clare of Assisi in the miniseries Francesco.

In 2015, Serraiocco starred in the film Cloro, directed by Lamberto Sanfelice. The film was presented both at Robert Redford's Sundance Film Festival and at the 65th Berlinale (Generation section). She was nominated best actress at the 2015 Globo d'oro award for this role. During the same year, Serraiocco was chosen by Enrico Pau to play the role of Tecla in the film Accabadora co-starring Donatella Finocchiaro and Barry Ward. Shortly after she was invited to be part of the jury at Independent section of the 2015 Rome Film Fest.

Serraiocco was awarded the Shooting Stars Award as best European talent during the 66th Berlin International Film Festival. Meanwhile, Serraiocco landed the lead role in Marco Danieli's debut feature film Worldly Girl, that was presented within the GdA review during the Venice Film Festival. Her performance in this film granted her several recognitions: the "Premio Pasinetti" (the National guild of Film critics' award) as Best Actress and the nomination for Best Actress both in the 2017 edition of Globo d'oro and Nastri d'argento. In addition to this she won the Golden Ciak along with Michele Riondino as best acting duo of the year.

She landed the female leading role of Nora in No Country for Young Men directed by Giovanni Veronesi in 2017, whose subject was inspired by the radio show hosted by Danieli on Radio 2. The film got Serraiocco the nomination as Best Lead Actress in the 2017 Nastri d’Argento. Also, she played the main character in Cosimo Gomez's debut film Brutti e Cattivi that was presented in the "Orizzonti" section of the 2017 Venice Film Fest. Serraiocco was cast as a series regular in the TV series Counterpart, where she played the role of Baldwin alongside Academy Award winner J. K. Simmons. Her performance in Counterpart gained her a Best Supporting Actress nomination at the Autostraddle TV Awards.

Later in 2017, she returned to Italy to shoot Alessandro Capitani's debut film In viaggio con Adele, which was presented at the 2018 Rome Film Festival. Still in that year, she returned to Los Angeles to shoot the second season of Counterpart (aired in January 2019). After that, she was chosen by director Renato De Maria to play the lead female role in his movie Lo Spietato. In 2019, she was chosen as a member of the international jury at the Kiev film festival, Molodist 48. In September of the same year she took the role of Marica in Non Odiare, directed by Mauro Mancini. The film was presented at the 2020 Venice Film Festival (Critic's Week). For this role she gained the prestigious award "Nastro d’argento" ad best supporting actress. Most recently, she was cast in the leading female role in Lo Sto Bene, directed by Donato Rotunno which was presented at the Rome Film Festival 2020.

In 2022 she was chosen as a member of the jury at the 72nd annual Berlin International Film Festival (Shooting Stars award).
During the same year Serraiocco landed the female lead role in “Il signore delle formiche”, directed by Gianni Amelio, that was presented at the Venice Film Festival 79 in Official Competition.
Most recently, she was cast as the role of Giulia in the  movie Siccità, directed by Paolo Virzì. The film has been selected at the Venice Film Festival 79, Out of Competition. For this role she gained the prestigious award “ Premio Pasinetti" as best ensemble  cast. 
She has been cast in the movie “ Il primo giorno della mia vita”, directed by Paolo Genovese and “ Il ritorno di Casanova”, directed by  Oscar winning Gabriele Salvatores. Both films are currently in post production.

Filmography

Film

Television

Awards

References

External links

 
 

1990 births
Living people
People from Pescara
Italian film actresses
Italian stage actresses
Italian television actresses
Centro Sperimentale di Cinematografia alumni
Nastro d'Argento winners